McKittrick-Wheelock syndrome is an uncommon syndrome caused by large, villous adenomas that secrete high quantities of electrolyte-rich mucin. This may lead to pre-renal acute kidney injury, secretory diarrhea, and dehydration. It is estimated that 2-3% of large villous adenomas, typically greater than 4 cm in diameter, will present with this hypersecretory pattern.

Symptoms and Signs
Patients typically present with a history of chronic, watery diarrhea. Before the cause is established, they may have multiple hospitalizations for dehydration and kidney failure. Patients may present with hyponatremia, hypokalemia, and elevated creatinine.

Diagnosis

Treatment
The treatment is supportive until the villous adenoma can be resected surgically.

History
The syndrome was first described by Leland S. McKittrick and Frank C. Wheelock. In 1954 they reported a case of an 84-year-old woman with a large villous papilloma of the rectum, who presented with weakness, syncope and oliguria.

See also
 Colorectal cancer
 Sessile serrated adenoma
 Tubulovillous adenoma

References

Digestive system neoplasia
Syndromes